Oberhaid is an Ortsgemeinde – a community belonging to a Verbandsgemeinde – in the Westerwaldkreis in Rhineland-Palatinate, Germany.

Geography

The community lies in the Westerwald between Koblenz and Siegen on the edge of the Kannenbäckerland. Through the community flows the Sayn, which belongs to the Rhine drainage basin. Oberhaid belongs to the Verbandsgemeinde of Ransbach-Baumbach, a kind of collective municipality. Its seat is in the like-named town.

History
In 1376, Oberhaid had its first documentary mention as Heide.

Politics

The municipal council is made up of 8 council members who were elected in a majority vote in a municipal election on 13 June 2004.

Economy and infrastructure

Transport
Bundesautobahn 3 and the Cologne-Frankfurt high-speed rail line run through Oberhaid's municipal area. The nearest Autobahn interchange is Ransbach-Baumbach (Nr. 38), some 6 km southeast of the middle of the community. The nearest station on the high-speed rail line is Montabaur; nearer still, however, is Siershahn station on the Unterwesterwaldbahn (railway).

References

External links
Oberhaid 

Municipalities in Rhineland-Palatinate
Westerwaldkreis